This is a list of bridges and tunnels on the National Register of Historic Places in the U.S. state of Alabama.

See also
List of bridges in Alabama

References

 National Register
Bridges
Alabama
Bridges